HTMS Phutthayotfa Chulalok (FFG-461) is the former , . The ship is named after the first king of the Chakri Dynasty, King Phutthayotfa Chulaok the Great.

The Royal Thai Navy first leased the ship from the US Navy after she was decommissioned on July 30, 1994. The ship was eventually purchased on December 9, 1999.

On 22 September 2020, HTMS Phutthayotfa Chulalok is converted into a floating museum at Sattahip Naval Base in Sattahip District.

Gallery

References

External links

USS Truett

Ships built in Bridge City, Louisiana
Phutthayotfa Chulalok-class frigates
Museum ships in Thailand
1973 ships